Jerry N. Hess (1931–2017) was a 20th-Century American oral historian of U.S. presidential libraries, particularly the Harry S. Truman Library:  his name appears in numerous books which include research into major personalities related to mid-20th-Century American national politics and draw upon the more than 500 oral histories available at the Truman Library alone.

Background

Hess was born on September 24, 1931, in Cedar Vale, Kansas.  His parents were James Nelson and Mary Elixabeth Burge. He had one older brother, Norman Burge Hess. He obtained a BA from Kansas State University of Lawrence and MA from the University of Missouri at Kansas City.

Career

In 1951, Hess entered the U.S. Navy, where he served until 1955.

Hess served as an oral historian for President Harry S. Truman Library as well as the National Archives in Washington, DC. He helped develop other presidential libraries.

After retirement, he volunteered as an oral archivist for the Ringling Circus.

Oral histories

Hess' Truman Library interviews include:

 George E. Allen
 Vernice Anderson
 Eben A. Ayers
 John E. Barriere
 Jack L. Bell
 David K. E. Bruce
 Tom C. Clark 
 Bruce C. Clarke
 Clark Clifford
 William K. Divers
 General William H. Draper Jr.
 George M. Elsey
 Stanley R. Fike
 Edward T. Folliard
 Joseph A. Fox
 Clayton Fritchey
 Warner Gardner
 Roswell Gilpatric
 Charles J. Greene
 William H. Hastie
 Judge Richmond B. Keech
 E. W. Kenworthy
 Milton S. Kronheim, Sr.
 David L. Lawrence
 Gould Lincoln
 Max Lowenthal
 John J. Muccio
 Philleo Nash
 Frank Pace Jr.
 John W. Snyder
 Stephen J. Spingarn
 John L. Sullivan
 Theodore Tannenwald, Jr.
 Phillip W. Voltz

Personal and death

Hess was a 32nd Degree Mason with life membership in the Scottish Rite Valley of Tampa. He was also a member of:  the Grand Chapter of Royal Arch Masons of Missouri, the Sons of the American Revolution, the American Legion and Veterans of Foreign Wars, and the Shriners International.

On June 4, 1960, Hess married Barbara H. Neubauer; she died in 1994.  In 1998, he married Bertie Lee Ruth; she died in 2016. In 2006, he and Bertie moved to Sunnyside, Florida.

Hess died age 85 on June 23, 2017, at Doctor’s Hospital in Sarasota, Florida.

References

External sources-

 Truman Library:  Oral History Interviews (more than 500)
 Truman Library:  Photo of Hess et al. (1958)

1931 births
2017 deaths
American historians